Cook Door  is a chain of fast food restaurants based in Cairo, Egypt. It is one of Egypt's fast food chains, along with Smiley's Grill and Mo'men.

History

Cook Door, founded in 1988, gained popularity within the Egyptian market/youth. Starting from just one branch in Heliopolis, until recently expanding within the last few years to multiple branches including other governorates.

Outlets

Egypt

 Alexandria, 2
 Assuit
 Cairo
 Damietta
 El Mahalla El Kubra
 Giza
 Hurghada
 Ismailia
 Mansoura
 Marsa Matrouh
 North Coast (Marina)
 Port Said
 Sharm El Sheikh
 Suez
 Tanta
 Zagazig

Arab World
 Jeddah
 Riyadh
 Kuwait City
 Dubai (AlBarsha)
 Damascus (Cham City Center)
 Doha (Airport Branch & Villagio Branch)

References

External links
Official Website
Egypt Restaurants Menu
Sliding Door Locks & Handles

Companies based in Cairo
Fast-food chains of Egypt
Restaurants established in 1988
Egyptian brands